Marko Marijan Mušič (born 30 January 1941) is a Slovenian architect. He has designed buildings in cities such as Zagreb, Skopje and Ljubljana. Since May 2008 he has been a vice-president of the Slovenian Academy of Sciences and Arts (SAZU).

Works
 Hall of the Seven Secretaries of the League of Communist Youth of Yugoslavia (SKOJ), Zagreb (1966)
 University Center, Skopje (1975–1978)
 Memorial Hall, Bosanski Šamac (1975–1978)
 Ljubljana railway station (1980)
 Incarnation Church, Dravlje, Ljubljana (1980–1985)
 New Žale Cemetery (1982–1988)
 Saint Francis's Church, Kotor Varoš (1986–1991)
 Domus Slovenica, Vienna (1987–1988)
 Novo Mesto Bus Station (1989)
 New National and University Library of Slovenia (NUK II) (1989)
 Hercules Fountain, Old Square, Ljubljana (1991)
 Teharje Memorial Park (1993)
 Apostolic Nunciature to Slovenia project (1998)

Sources
Slovenian Academy of Sciences and Arts 

Slovenian architects
1941 births
Living people
Members of the Slovenian Academy of Sciences and Arts